The Federal Trade Commission (FTC) is an independent agency of the United States government whose principal mission is the enforcement of civil (non-criminal) antitrust law and the promotion of consumer protection. The FTC shares jurisdiction over federal civil antitrust enforcement with the Department of Justice Antitrust Division. The agency is headquartered in the Federal Trade Commission Building in Washington, DC.

The FTC was established in 1914 with the passage of the Federal Trade Commission Act, signed in response to the 19th-century monopolistic trust crisis. Since its inception, the FTC has enforced the provisions of the Clayton Act, a key antitrust statute, as well as the provisions of the FTC Act,  et seq. Over time, the FTC has been delegated with the enforcement of additional business regulation statutes and has promulgated a number of regulations (codified in Title 16 of the Code of Federal Regulations). The broad statutory authority granted to the FTC provides it with more surveillance and monitoring abilities than it actually uses.

The FTC is composed of five commissioners, who each serve seven-year terms. Members of the commission are nominated by the President and subject to Senate confirmation, and no more than three FTC members can be of the same party. One member of the body serves as FTC Chair at the President's pleasure, with Commissioner Lina Khan having served as chair since June 2021.

History

Early history 
Following the Supreme Court decisions against Standard Oil and American Tobacco in May 1911, the first version of a bill to establish a commission to regulate interstate trade was introduced on January 25, 1912, by Oklahoma congressman Dick Thompson Morgan. He would make the first speech on the House floor advocating its creation on February 21, 1912.

Though the initial bill did not pass, the questions of trusts and antitrust dominated the 1912 election. Most political party platforms in 1912 endorsed the establishment of a federal trade commission with its regulatory powers placed in the hands of an administrative board, as an alternative to functions previously and necessarily exercised so slowly through the courts.

With the 1912 presidential election decided in favor of the Democrats and Woodrow Wilson, Morgan reintroduced a slightly amended version of his bill during the April 1913 special session. The national debate culminated in Wilson's signing of the FTC Act on September 26, 1914, with additional tightening of regulations in the Clayton Antitrust Act three weeks later.

The new FTC would absorb the staff and duties of Bureau of Corporations, previously established under the Department of Commerce and Labor in 1903.  The FTC could additionally challenge "unfair methods of competition" and enforce the Clayton Act's more specific prohibitions against certain price discrimination, vertical arrangements, interlocking directorates, and stock acquisitions.

Recent history 
In 1984, the FTC began to regulate the funeral home industry in order to protect consumers from deceptive practices. The FTC Funeral Rule requires funeral homes to provide all customers (and potential customers) with a General Price List (GPL), specifically outlining goods and services in the funeral industry, as defined by the FTC, and a listing of their prices. By law, the GPL must be presented on request to all individuals, and no one is to be denied a written, retainable copy of the GPL. In 1996, the FTC instituted the Funeral Rule Offenders Program (FROP), under which "funeral homes make a voluntary payment to the U.S. Treasury or appropriate state fund for an amount less than what would likely be sought if the Commission authorized filing a lawsuit for civil penalties. In addition, the funeral homes participate in the NFDA compliance program, which includes a review of the price lists, on-site training of the staff, and follow-up testing and certification on compliance with the Funeral Rule."

In the mid-1990s, the FTC launched the fraud sweeps concept where the agency and its federal, state, and local partners filed simultaneous legal actions against multiple telemarketing fraud targets. The first sweeps operation was Project Telesweep in July 1995 which cracked down on 100 business opportunity scams.

In the 2021 United States Supreme Court case, AMG Capital Management, LLC v. FTC, the Court found unanimously that the FTC did not have power under  of the FTC Act, amended in 1973, to seek equitable relief in courts; it had the power to seek only injunctive relief.

Members of the Commission

Current members of the FTC 
The commission is headed by five commissioners, who each serve seven-year terms. Commissioners are nominated by the president and confirmed by the Senate. No more than three commissioners can be of the same political party. In practice, this means that two commissioners are of the opposition party. However, three members of the FTC throughout its history have been without party affiliation, with the most recent independent, Pamela Jones Harbour, serving from 2003 to 2009.

Notes
 Shortly after the U.S. Senate confirmed Lina Khan as a commissioner, President Biden tapped her to serve as Chair of the commission.
 The FTC Act allows commissioners to remain in their position after their term expires, until a replacement has been appointed.

Backgrounds of commissioners 
As of 2021, there have been:

 Three African-Americans to serve on the FTC: A. Leon Higginbotham Jr. (served from 1962 to 1964), Mozelle W. Thompson (served from 1997 to 2004), Pamela Jones Harbour (served from 2003 to 2009)
 Three Asian-Americans to serve on the FTC: Dennis Yao (served from 1991 to 1994), Rohit Chopra (served from 2018 to 2021), and Lina Khan (served since 2021); Khan is the first Asian-American to serve as FTC Chair
 Three independents to serve on the FTC: Philip Elman (served from 1961 to 1970), Mary Azcuenaga (served from 1984 to 1998), and Pamela Jones Harbour (served from 2003 to 2009)

Bureaus

Bureau of Consumer Protection
The Bureau of Consumer Protection's mandate is to protect consumers against unfair or deceptive acts or practices in commerce. With the written consent of the commission, Bureau attorneys enforce federal laws related to consumer affairs and rules promulgated by the FTC. Its functions include investigations, enforcement actions, and consumer and business education. Areas of principal concern for this bureau are: advertising and marketing, financial products and practices, telemarketing fraud, privacy and identity protection, etc. The bureau also is responsible for the United States National Do Not Call Registry.

Under the FTC Act, the commission has the authority, in most cases, to bring its actions in federal court through its own attorneys. In some consumer protection matters, the FTC appears with, or supports, the U.S. Department of Justice.

Bureau of Competition
The Bureau of Competition is the division of the FTC charged with elimination and prevention of "anticompetitive" business practices. It accomplishes this through the enforcement of antitrust laws, review of proposed mergers, and investigation into other non-merger business practices that may impair competition. Such non-merger practices include horizontal restraints, involving agreements between direct competitors, and vertical restraints, involving agreements among businesses at different levels in the same industry (such as suppliers and commercial buyers).The FTC shares enforcement of antitrust laws with the Department of Justice. However, while the FTC is responsible for civil enforcement of antitrust laws, the Antitrust Division of the Department of Justice has the power to bring both civil and criminal action in antitrust matters.

Bureau of Economics
The Bureau of Economics was established to support the Bureau of Competition and Consumer Protection by providing expert knowledge related to the economic impacts of the FTC's legislation and operation.

Other bureaus 

 The FTC maintains an Office of Technology Research and Investigation to assist it in technology-related enforcement actions. 
 The FTC generally selects its Chief Technologist from among computer science academics and noted practitioners. The role has previously been filled by Steven K. Bellovin, Lorrie Cranor, Edward Felten, Ashkan Soltani, and Latanya Sweeney. 
 The FTC also maintains an academic in residence program, inviting leading legal scholars to join the FTC for a year as a Senior Policy Advisor. The role has been held by Tim Wu in 2011, Paul Ohm in 2012, and Andrea M. Matwyshyn in 2014.

Activities

The FTC investigates issues raised by reports from consumers and businesses, pre-merger notification filings, congressional inquiries, or reports in the media. These issues include, for instance, false advertising and other forms of fraud. FTC investigations may pertain to a single company or an entire industry. If the results of the investigation reveal unlawful conduct, the FTC may seek voluntary compliance by the offending business through a consent order, file an administrative complaint, or initiate federal litigation. During the course of regulatory activities, the FTC is authorized to collect records, but not on-site inspections.

Traditionally an administrative complaint is heard in front of an independent administrative law judge (ALJ) with FTC staff acting as prosecutors. The case is reviewed de novo by the full FTC commission which then may be appealed to the U.S. Court of Appeals and finally to the Supreme Court.

Under the FTC Act, the federal courts retain their traditional authority to issue equitable relief, including the appointment of receivers, monitors, the imposition of asset freezes to guard against the spoliation of funds, immediate access to business premises to preserve evidence, and other relief including financial disclosures and expedited discovery. In numerous cases, the FTC employs this authority to combat serious consumer deception or fraud. Additionally, the FTC has rulemaking power to address concerns regarding industry-wide practices. Rules promulgated under this authority are known as Trade Rules.

One of the Federal Trade Commission's other major focuses is identity theft. The FTC serves as a federal repository for individual consumer complaints regarding identity theft. Even though the FTC does not resolve individual complaints, it does use the aggregated information to determine where federal action might be taken. The complaint form is available online or by phone (1-877-ID-THEFT).

The FTC has been involved in the oversight of the online advertising industry and its practice of behavioral targeting for some time. In 2011 the FTC proposed a "Do Not Track" mechanism to allow Internet users to opt-out of behavioral targeting.

The FTC, along with the  Environmental Protection Agency and Department of Justice also empowers third-party enforcer-firms to engage in some regulatory oversight, e.g. the FTC requires other energy companies to audit offshore oil platform operators.

In 2013, the FTC issued a comprehensive revision of its Green guides, which set forth standards for environmental marketing.

Unfair or deceptive practices affecting consumers

Section 5 of the Federal Trade Commission Act,  grants the FTC power to investigate and prevent deceptive trade practices. The statute declares that "unfair methods of competition in or affecting commerce, and unfair or deceptive acts or practices in or affecting commerce, are hereby declared unlawful."

Unfairness and deception towards consumers represent two distinct areas of FTC enforcement and authority. The FTC also has authority over unfair methods of competition between businesses.

Definitions of unfairness 
Courts have identified three main factors that must be considered in consumer unfairness cases: (1) whether the practice injures consumers; (2) whether the practice violates established public policy; and (3) whether it is unethical or unscrupulous.

Definitions of deception
In a letter to the Chairman of the House Committee on Energy and Commerce, the FTC defined the elements of deception cases. First, "there must be a representation, omission or practice that is likely to mislead the consumer." In the case of omissions, the Commission considers the implied representations understood by the consumer.

A misleading omission occurs when information is not disclosed to correct reasonable consumer expectations. Second, the Commission examines the practice from the perspective of a reasonable consumer being targeted by the practice. Finally the representation or omission must be a material one—that is one that would have changed consumer behavior.

Dot Com Disclosures guide
In its Dot Com Disclosures guide, the FTC said that "disclosures that are required to prevent deception or to provide consumers material information about a transaction must be presented clearly and conspicuously." The FTC suggested a number of different factors that would help determine whether the information was "clear and conspicuous" including but not limited to: 
the placement of the disclosure in an advertisement and its proximity to the claim it is qualifying,
the prominence of the disclosure,
whether items in other parts of the advertisement distract attention from the disclosure,
whether the advertisement is so lengthy that the disclosure needs to be repeated,
whether disclosures in audio messages are presented in an adequate volume and cadence and visual disclosures appear for a sufficient duration, and 
whether the language of the disclosure is understandable to the intended audience.
However, the "key is the overall net impression."

Notable recent cases

Cyberspace.com case 
In F.T.C. v. Cyberspace.com the FTC found that sending consumers mail that appeared to be a check for $3.50 to the consumer attached to an invoice was deceptive when cashing the check constituted an agreement to pay a monthly fee for internet access. The back of the check, in fine print, disclosed the existence of this agreement to the consumer. The FTC concluded that the practice was misleading to reasonable consumers, especially since there was evidence that less than one percent of the 225,000 individuals and businesses billed for the internet service actually logged on.

Gateway Learning case 
In In re Gateway Learning Corp. the FTC alleged that Gateway committed unfair and deceptive trade practices by making retroactive changes to its privacy policy without informing customers and by violating its own privacy policy by selling customer information when it had said it would not. Gateway settled the complaint by entering into a consent decree with the FTC that required it to surrender some profits and placed restrictions upon Gateway for the following 20 years.

Sears Holdings case 
In In the Matter of Sears Holdings Management Corp., the FTC alleged that a research software program provided by Sears was deceptive because it collected information about nearly all online behavior, a fact that was only disclosed in legalese, buried within the end user license agreement.

Loot boxes in computer and video games as gambling 

In November 2018 by request of US Senator Maggie Hassan, the FTC decided to investigate whether paid-for loot boxes, virtual items with random benefits in certain video games, were a form of gambling.

Money Now Funding / Cash4Businesses case 
In September 2013, a federal court closed an elusive business opportunity scheme on the request of the FTC, namely "Money Now Funding"/"Cash4Businesses". The FTC alleged that the defendants misrepresented potential earnings, violated the National Do Not Call Register, and violated the FTC's Business Opportunity Rule in preventing a fair consumer evaluation of the business. This was one of the first definitive actions taken by any regulator against a company engaging in transaction laundering, where almost US$6 million were processed illicitly.

In December 2018, two defendants, Nikolas Mihilli and Dynasty Merchants, LLC, settled with the FTC. They were banned from processing credit card transactions, though the initial monetary judgment of $5.8 million was suspended due to the defendants’ inability to pay.

OMICS Publishing Group case 
In 2016, the FTC launched action against the academic journal publisher OMICS Publishing Group for producing predatory journals and organizing predatory conferences. This action, partly in response to ongoing pressure from the academic community, is the first action taken by the FTC against an academic journal publisher.

The complaint alleges that the defendants have been "deceiving academics and researchers about the nature of its publications and hiding publication fees ranging from hundreds to thousands of dollars". It additionally notes that "OMICS regularly advertises conferences featuring academic experts who were never scheduled to appear in order to attract registrants" and that attendees "spend hundreds or thousands of dollars on registration fees and travel costs to attend these scientific conferences." Manuscripts are also sometimes held hostage, with OMICS refusing to allow submissions to be withdrawn and thereby preventing resubmission to another journal for consideration. Library scientist Jeffrey Beall has described OMICS as among the most egregious of predatory publishers. In November 2017, a federal court in the  Court for the District of Nevada granted a preliminary injunction that: 
"prohibits the defendants from making misrepresentations regarding their academic journals and conferences, including that specific persons are editors of their journals or have agreed to participate in their conferences.  It also prohibits the defendants from falsely representing that their journals engage in peer review, that their journals are included in any academic journal indexing service, or any measurement of the extent to which their journals are cited. It also requires that the defendants clearly and conspicuously disclose all costs associated with submitting or publishing articles in their journals."

Activities in the healthcare industry 
In addition to prospective analysis of the effects of mergers and acquisitions, the FTC has recently resorted to retrospective analysis and monitoring of consolidated hospitals. Thus, it also uses retroactive data to demonstrate that some hospital mergers and acquisitions are hurting consumers, particularly in terms of higher prices. Here are some recent examples of the FTC's success in blocking or unwinding of hospital consolidations or affiliations:

Phoebe Putney Memorial Hospital and Palmyra Medical Center in Georgia 
In 2011, the FTC successfully challenged in court the $195 million acquisition of Palmyra Medical Center by Phoebe Putney Memorial Hospital. The FTC alleged that the transaction would create a monopoly as it would "reduce competition significantly and allow the combined Phoebe/Palmyra to raise prices for general acute-care hospital services charged to commercial health plans, substantially harming patients and local employers and employees". The Supreme Court on February 19, 2013, ruled in favor of the FTC.

ProMedica health system and St. Luke's hospital in Ohio 
Similarly, court attempts by ProMedica health system in Ohio to overturn an order by the FTC to the company to unwind its 2010 acquisition of St. Luke's hospital were unsuccessful. The FTC claimed that the acquisition would hurt consumers through higher premiums because insurance companies would be required to pay more. In December 2011, an administrative judge upheld the FTC's decision, noting that the behavior of ProMedica health system and St. Luke's was indeed anticompetitive. The court ordered ProMedica to divest St. Luke's to a buyer that would be approved by the FTC within 180 days of the date of the order.

OSF healthcare system and Rockford Health System in Illinois. 
In November 2011, the FTC filed a lawsuit alleging that the proposed acquisition of Rockford by OSF would drive up prices for general acute-care inpatient services as OSF would face only one competitor (SwedishAmerican health system) in the Rockford area and would have a market share of 64%. Later in 2012, OSF announced that it had abandoned its plans to acquire Rockford Health System.

See also

Business opportunity
Children's Online Privacy Protection Act
Competition policy
Competition regulator
Consumer Financial Protection Bureau
Consumer Product Safety Commission
Federal Trade Commission Act
Fair Debt Collection Practices Act
Federal Antimonopoly Service, Russian equivalent
Franchising
FTC Fair Information Practices
FTC regulation of behavioral advertising
Gramm–Leach–Bliley Act
Humphrey's Executor v. United States
In the Matter of Sears Holdings Management Corporation
Information broker
List of chairs of the Federal Trade Commission
List of members of the Federal Trade Commission
Sweepstakes
United States v. Google Inc.

References

Further reading

External links

Federal Trade Commission in the Federal Register
Consumer Complaint Assistant, Federal Trade Commission 
Federal Trade Commission on USAspending.gov
Federal Trade Commission Decisions (July 1949 - December 2005) This is a compendium of agency decisions in administrative cases brought under 16 C.F.R. parts II and III. Federal court decisions may be found elsewhere, in published federal case reports. The site's search engine can limit its results from the archive.
Federal Trade Commission Identity Theft Complaint Form

 
Corporate crime
Competition regulators
Consumer rights agencies
Government agencies established in 1914
Organizations based in Washington, D.C.
Articles containing video clips